Hermitage School District 12  is a school district in Bradley County, Arkansas, serving Hermitage. Its schools are Hermitage Elementary School and Hermitage High School.

It includes the unincorporated area of Vick.

References

External links
 
School districts in Arkansas
Education in Bradley County, Arkansas